Vicenza Giovanna Rovisi (Venice, 1750 - Cavalese (Trento), 1824) was an Italian painter in a late Baroque and Neoclassical styles.

She had trained with her father, Valentino Rovisi, a follower of Giambattista Tiepolo. She married the painter of the Val di Fieme, A. L. Bonora (Domenico Bonora?). She worked alongside her father in his late age, including on the Via Crucis of the parish church of Torcegno (1775) and the frescoes in the parish churches of Roncegno and Cavedine (1779-1782). Circa 1779, she alone completed the frescoes in the apse at Roncegno (St Paul on the Road to Damascus and Episodes in the Life of St Peter).

References

1750 births
1824 deaths
18th-century Italian painters
18th-century Italian women artists
19th-century Italian painters
19th-century Italian women artists
Italian neoclassical painters
Italian women painters
Painters from Venice